François-Victor Équilbecq (1872–1917) was a French author of works on the customs and folklore from French West Africa.

Works 
 La légende de Samba Guélâdio Digui Prince du Foûta 
 Essai sur la littérature merveilleuse des noirs, suivi de Contes indigènes de l'Ouest africain français (1913)

External links
 

1872 births
1917 deaths
French West Africa
French male writers